Pablo Rudomin Zevnovaty (born June 5, 1934 in Mexico City) is a Mexican-Russian biologist, physiologist, and neuroscientist. He is regarded as one of the most prestigious neurophysiologists in the international community. His studies have been fundamentally directed to the analysis of mechanisms of the central control of the information transmitted by the sensory fibers in the spinal cord, and of how these are modified during central and peripheral injuries, as well as during processes of acute inflammation.

Born from  Russian parents. He is a graduate of the Biology program of the National School of Biological Sciences of the National Polytechnic Institute (IPN. México). He has been the director of the program of neuroscience at the CINVESTAV (Center for Research and Advanced Studies) of the IPN since 1984. At the neuroscience program, his research has focused on the analysis of the central nervous system control mechanisms for the transmission of information that is conveyed by nerve fibers originating in the skin  and muscles to the lumbosacral spinal cord.

He has also been a guest researcher at the following centers:
 Rockefeller Institute for Medical Research – New York City, US (1959–1960)
 Institute of Medical Pathology – Siena, Italy (1960–1961)
 Marine Biology Laboratory – Woods Hole, Massachusetts, US (1960)
 National Institutes of Health – Bethesda, Maryland, US (1968–1969, 1984–1986 and 1990–1991)
 Göteborg University – Gothenburg, Sweden (1983)

He has also held honorary positions:

 President  of the Mexican Academy of Sciences
 Vice-president of the Mexican Society of Physiological Sciences
 General coordinator of the Presidential Science Advisory Council.
 Counseling member of the CONACYT.

He has been professor since 1961 and from 1993 he is member of El Colegio Nacional.

Awards
 National Alfonso Caso Science Award from the Mexican Academy of Sciences
 National Science Award;
 Award for the Best Paper of the Mexican Academy of Sciences;
 Prince of Asturias Award (1987);
 Luis Elizondo Award of the ITESM
 Lázaro Cárdenas Award.
 Dr Honoris Causa, University of Puebla, Mexico
 Dr Honoris Causa, Universidad Autónoma de Nuevo León (UANL), Mexico
 Dr Honoris Causa, Universidad Nacional Autónoma de México, Mexico (2011)

References

External links
Pablo Rudomin - Society for Neuroscience
Biography at El Colegio Nacional
Pablo Rudomin - El Colegio Nacional
DEPARTAMENTO DE FISIOLOGIA BIOFISICA Y NEUROCIENCIAS - Dr. Pablo Rudomín Zevnovaty
Miembro del Comité de Ciencias Naturales
Pablo Rudomin Zevnovaty: científico incansable
Pablo Rudomin: experimentar con la memoria del dolor
CURRICULUM VITAE
IPN reconoce a Portilla y Rudomín
JACINTO CONVIT AND PABLO RUDOMÍN
Una vida entregada a la ciencia. Entrevista con Pablo Rudomín

1934 births
Members of El Colegio Nacional (Mexico)
Instituto Politécnico Nacional alumni
Academic staff of the Instituto Politécnico Nacional
Mexican Jews
Mexican people of Russian-Jewish descent
Living people
Mexican neuroscientists
People from Mexico City
Academic staff of the University of Gothenburg
Members of the Mexican Academy of Sciences